PharmacoEconomics is a peer-reviewed medical journal published by Adis International (Springer Nature) that covers the fields of health economics, pharmacoeconomics, and quality-of-life assessment.

Abstracting and indexing 
 PharmacoEconomics  is abstracted and indexed in:

According to the Journal Citation Reports, the journal has a 2021 impact factor of 4.579.

References

External links
 

Pharmacology journals
English-language journals
Publications established in 1992
Springer Science+Business Media academic journals
Monthly journals